Asan Circuit is a 0.625 mile (1.005 km) motor racing circuit in Miyoshi District, Tokushima city, Tokushima Prefecture, on the island of Shikoku, Japan.

References

External links 
Asan Circuit Official site (Japanese)

Motorsport venues in Japan
Sports venues in Tokushima Prefecture